The 1995–96 NBA season was the Magic's seventh season in the National Basketball Association. During the off-season, the Magic signed free agent Jon Koncak. Coming off their trip to the NBA Finals, where they were swept in four games by the Houston Rockets, the Magic won their second straight Atlantic Division title with a 60–22 record, a regular season record which still stands as the best in franchise history. This despite missing Shaquille O'Neal for the first 22 games of the season due to a preseason thumb injury. Penny Hardaway stepped up in O'Neal's absence and was awarded Player of the Month for November, as the Magic got off to a 13–2 start, and later held a 34–14 record at the All-Star break. At midseason, the team traded Jeff Turner to the expansion Vancouver Grizzlies in exchange for Kenny Gattison, who never played for the Magic due to arm and neck injuries. This season also saw three-point specialist Dennis Scott take a place in the league history books by scoring 267 three-point field goals, a single season record since broken by Stephen Curry. Scott set a then-record of 11 three-point field goals in a 119–104 home win against the Atlanta Hawks on April 18, 1996.

Hardaway averaged 21.7 points, 7.1 assists and 2.0 steals per game, and was named to the All-NBA First Team, while O'Neal averaged 26.6 points, 11.0 rebounds and 2.1 blocks per game in 54 games, while being named to the All-NBA Third Team, and Scott provided the team with 17.5 points per game. In addition, Horace Grant provided with 13.4 points and 9.2 rebounds per game, while Nick Anderson contributed 14.7 points, 5.4 rebounds and 1.6 steals per game, and Brian Shaw contributed 6.6 points and 4.5 assists per game off the bench. Both Hardaway and O'Neal were selected for the 1996 NBA All-Star Game, while Grant made the NBA All-Defensive Second Team. Hardaway also finished in third place in Most Valuable Player voting, while O'Neal finished tied in ninth place. This was also the only season of O'Neal's NBA career, where he hit his only three-pointer in a 121–91 home win against the Milwaukee Bucks on February 16, 1996.

Despite the franchise best record, the Magic were beaten by the top seed in the East, the dominant Chicago Bulls, who finished with a then all-time best record of 72–10. In the playoffs, the Magic would sweep the Detroit Pistons in three straight games in the Eastern Conference First Round. In the Eastern Conference Semi-finals, they defeated the 6th-seeded Hawks in five games, despite losing Game 4 at The Omni in Atlanta, 104–99.

The Eastern Conference Finals matched up the Magic with the Bulls, the team they had eliminated in the previous year's playoffs. However, Grant went down with an elbow injury in Game 1, which the Magic lost on the road, 121–83, and he was out for the rest of the series. The Magic suffered another painful blow when Anderson went down with a wrist injury in a 86–67 home loss in Game 3, and he was also out for the rest of the series. The Bulls would be too strong as they swept the Magic in four straight games. Thereby, the Magic became the first team to be eliminated from the playoffs in a sweep for three consecutive seasons since the 1950 Chicago Stags. The Bulls would defeat the Seattle SuperSonics in six games in the NBA Finals, winning their fourth championship in six years.

Following the season, the All-Star center O'Neal left the team, signing as a free agent with the Los Angeles Lakers after four seasons in Orlando, and Gattison and Anthony Bowie were both released to free agency.

Draft picks

Roster

Roster Notes
 Power forward Kenny Gattison was acquired from the expansion Vancouver Grizzlies at midseason, but did not play for the Magic due to arm and neck injuries.

Regular season

Season standings

Record vs. opponents

Playoffs
The Magic opened up their playoffs campaign on April 26 against the Detroit Pistons, a game they won convincingly 112-92 at home in the Orlando Arena. The Magic would also win Game 2 at home before clinching the series, and a sweep, of the Pistons in Game 3 away from home at the Palace of Auburn Hills.

The second round put the Magic against the Atlanta Hawks. The Magic opened the series with two convincing wins at home, both with scoring margins greater than 20 points. The Magic carried this momentum into Game 3 away from home at the Omni, winning a closer fought match 102-96. The Hawks won Game 4, avoiding the sweep, but the Magic were too strong and won Game 5 at home to clinch the series 4-1.

The Eastern Conference finals saw the Magic face the Chicago Bulls and Michael Jordan, a team they had eliminated in the previous years playoffs. With Horace Grant out with an elbow injury from Game 1, the dominant Chicago Bulls would prove to be too strong for the Orlando this year, sweeping the series 4-0 and denying the Magic consecutive trips to the NBA finals.

|- align="center" bgcolor="#ccffcc"
| 1
| April 26
| Detroit
| W 112–92
| Dennis Scott (23)
| Horace Grant (13)
| Brian Shaw (11)
| Orlando Arena17,248
| 1–0
|- align="center" bgcolor="#ccffcc"
| 2
| April 28
| Detroit
| W 92–77
| Shaquille O'Neal (29)
| Horace Grant (10)
| Penny Hardaway (8)
| Orlando Arena17,248
| 2–0
|- align="center" bgcolor="#ccffcc"
| 3
| April 30
| @ Detroit
| W 101–98
| Penny Hardaway (24)
| Horace Grant (16)
| Penny Hardaway (5)
| The Palace of Auburn Hills20,386
| 3–0
|-

|- align="center" bgcolor="#ccffcc"
| 1
| May 8
| Atlanta
| W 117–105
| Shaquille O'Neal (41)
| Shaquille O'Neal (13)
| O'Neal, Hardaway (6)
| Orlando Arena17,248
| 1–0
|- align="center" bgcolor="#ccffcc"
| 2
| May 10
| Atlanta
| W 120–94
| Shaquille O'Neal (28)
| Horace Grant (11)
| Penny Hardaway (7)
| Orlando Arena17,248
| 2–0
|- align="center" bgcolor="#ccffcc"
| 3
| May 12
| @ Atlanta
| W 103–96
| Shaquille O'Neal (24)
| Shaquille O'Neal (12)
| Penny Hardaway (6)
| Omni Coliseum15,476
| 3–0
|- align="center" bgcolor="#ffcccc"
| 4
| May 13
| @ Atlanta
| L 99–104
| Grant, Hardaway (29)
| Horace Grant (20)
| Penny Hardaway (11)
| Omni Coliseum12,645
| 3–1
|- align="center" bgcolor="#ccffcc"
| 5
| May 15
| Atlanta
| W 96–88
| Shaquille O'Neal (27)
| Shaquille O'Neal (15)
| O'Neal, Scott (4)
| Orlando Arena17,248
| 4–1
|-

|- align="center" bgcolor="#ffcccc"
| 1
| May 19
| @ Chicago
| L 83–121
| Penny Hardaway (38)
| Shaquille O'Neal (6)
| Shaquille O'Neal (6)
| United Center24,411
| 0–1
|- align="center" bgcolor="#ffcccc"
| 2
| May 21
| @ Chicago
| L 88–93
| Shaquille O'Neal (36)
| Shaquille O'Neal (16)
| Brian Shaw (6)
| United Center24,395
| 0–2
|- align="center" bgcolor="#ffcccc"
| 3
| May 25
| Chicago
| L 67–86
| Penny Hardaway (18)
| Shaquille O'Neal (12)
| Hardaway, O'Neal (3)
| Orlando Arena17,248
| 0–3
|- align="center" bgcolor="#ffcccc"
| 4
| May 27
| Chicago
| L 101–106
| Hardaway, O'Neal (28)
| Shaquille O'Neal (9)
| Penny Hardaway (8)
| Orlando Arena17,248
| 0–4
|-

Player statistics

NOTE: Please write the players statistics in alphabetical order by last name.

Season

Playoffs

Awards and honors
 Shaquille O'Neal – All-NBA 3rd team, All-Star
 Penny Hardaway – All-NBA 1st Team, Player of the Month (November), All-Star
 Horace Grant – All-Defensive 2nd Team
 Nick Anderson – Rich and Helen DeVos Community Enrichment Award

League records
During the 1995–96 season, Dennis Scott set the record for most three-point field goals scored in a regular season with 267.

Transactions

References

 Orlando Magic on Basketball Reference

Orlando Magic seasons
1995 in sports in Florida
1996 in sports in Florida